Craig Anthony Shelton (born May 1, 1957) is a retired American basketball player. He played in parts of two seasons in the National Basketball Association (NBA).

Shelton, a 6'7" small forward from Dunbar High School in Washington, D.C., played college basketball with his high school teammate John Duren at Georgetown University from 1976 to 1980.  For his college career, Shelton scored 1,409 points (15.2 per game) and collected 691 rebounds (7.4 per game).

After the close of his college career, Shelton was drafted in the second round of the 1980 NBA Draft by the Atlanta Hawks (28th overall).  He played for the Hawks for the 1980–81 NBA season, and played 4 games of the 1981–82 season before being waived.  He would play the remainder of the season in the Continental Basketball Association (CBA) for the Atlantic City Hi-Rollers and Lancaster Lightning.  He then played several seasons in Italy.

References

External links
Italian League profile

1957 births
Living people
American expatriate basketball people in Italy
American men's basketball players
Atlanta Hawks draft picks
Atlanta Hawks players
Atlantic City Hi-Rollers players
Basket Mestre 1958 players
Basketball players from Washington, D.C.
Dunbar High School (Washington, D.C.) alumni
Fulgor Libertas Forlì players
Georgetown Hoyas men's basketball players
Lancaster Lightning players
Pallacanestro Trieste players
Small forwards